Pararhizobium capsulatum is a bacterium from the genus Pararhizobium which was isolated from eutrophic forest pond in Germany.

References

External links
Type strain of Blastobacter capsulatus at BacDive -  the Bacterial Diversity Metadatabase

Rhizobiaceae
Bacteria described in 2015